The Plain, better known as The Marsh, was the majority of independent deputies in the French National Convention during the French Revolution.  They sat between the Girondists on their right and Montagnards on their left. Their name arises from the fact their benches were by the debating floor, lower down from the Montagnards. Its members were also known as Maraisards, or derogatorily Toads as toads live in marshes.

None of these three groups was an organized party as is known today. The Mountain and the Girondists did consist of individuals with similar views and agendas who socialized together and often coordinated political plans. However, The Plain consisted of uncommitted delegates that did not adhere to a single ideology, were not part of any political club and lacked leadership.  They constituted the majority of delegates to the Convention at 389 of 749 and voted with the Girondists or the Mountain depending on the persuasiveness of arguments on single issues, current circumstances and mood of the Convention. They initially sided with the Girondists, but by 1793 many backed the Mountain in executing Louis XVI and inaugurating the Terror.  The January 4 address by Plain member Bertrand Barère is credited in part for rallying undecided fellow members against the king.

Nearly all those elected to the Committee for Public Safety in 1793 were members of The Plain, including the popular Barère.

Later in 1794 disaffected members of the Mountain led by Jean-Lambert Tallien made a pact with leaders of the Plain Julien-François Palasne de Champeaux, François Antoine de Boissy d'Anglas and Pierre-Toussaint Durand de Maillane to end the Terror, ultimately inaugurating the Thermidorian Reaction.

Other notable members in 1792 included Emmanuel Joseph Sieyès, Jean-Jacques-Régis de Cambacérès, Antoine Claire Thibaudeau, Henri Grégoire, Philippe-Antoine Merlin de Douai, Louis Gustave le Doulcet de Pontécoulant, Louis Marie de La Révellière-Lépeaux, dramatist Marie-Joseph Chénier and Jacques-Antoine Dulaure who later sat with the Girondists. Pierre Claude François Daunou who associated with the Girondists has also been regarded as part of The Plain.

Electoral results

References 
Notes

Bibliography
 Will and Ariel Durant (1975). The Age of Napoleon. New York: Simon and Schuster.
 Sylvia Neely (2008). A Concise History of the French Revolution. Lanham – Boulder – New York – Toronto – Plymouth, United Kingdom: Rowman Littlefield Publishers, Inc.
 Simon Schama (1989). Citizens. New York: Alfred A. Knopf.

Groups of the French Revolution
Politics of France